Markus Schubert (born 12 June 1998) is a German footballer who plays as a goalkeeper for Dutch club Vitesse.

Club career

Dynamo Dresden
Starting in 2015–16, Schubert joined the main Dynamo Dresden squad, becoming the youngest active player in the club's history after debuting in a game against Preußen Münster on 28 November 2015. He was made Dresden's main goalkeeper in 2018–19, appearing full-time in all league matches except for the last three. The decision to not field Schubert in those matches was made by then-coach Cristian Fiel in an effort to "protect" him from hostile behaviour directed at him by supporters, following the announcement of his departure from the club.

Schalke 04
On 5 July 2019, Schubert joined Schalke 04 on a four-year contract.

On 15 December 2019, he made his Bundesliga debut in a 1–0 home win against Eintracht Frankfurt when he came on for Amine Harit in the 69th minute after goalkeeper Alexander Nübel received a red card. Following a string of poor performances by Nübel, who had already announced his move to Bayern Munich, he was permanently replaced by Schubert, who spent the rest of the season as Schalke's main goalkeeper. Prior to the 2020–2021 season, he was demoted to substitute keeper, with coach David Wagner electing to field Ralf Fährmann instead, who had previously been out on a loan.

On 30 September 2020, he joined Eintracht Frankfurt on a year-long loan. Schalke, in turn, loaned Frederik Rønnow from Frankfurt, who took Schubert's place and went on to become the club's primary goalkeeper for the season.

Vitesse
On 14 July 2021, Schubert signed for three years with Vitesse.

International career
Schubert has represented Germany at every age group from under-17 to under-21.

Career statistics

Club

Honours 

Germany U21
UEFA European Under-21 Championship: 2021; runner-up: 2019

References

External links

1998 births
Living people
Sportspeople from Freiberg
German footballers
Association football goalkeepers
Dynamo Dresden players
FC Schalke 04 players
FC Schalke 04 II players
Eintracht Frankfurt players
SBV Vitesse players
Bundesliga players
2. Bundesliga players
3. Liga players
Eredivisie players
Germany youth international footballers
Footballers from Saxony
Germany under-21 international footballers